Andreas Bødtker Christensen  (born 10 April 1996) is a Danish professional footballer who plays as a centre-back for La Liga club Barcelona and the Denmark national team.

Christensen began his career at Skjold Birkerød and later joined Brøndby. He joined Chelsea at the age of 15 in February 2012, making his professional debut in October 2014. From 2015 to 2017, he was loaned to Bundesliga club Borussia Mönchengladbach, where he made 82 appearances and scored 7 goals.

Christensen made his full international debut for Denmark in June 2015, and represented the nation at the 2018 FIFA World Cup, UEFA Euro 2020 and the 2022 World Cup.

Club career

Chelsea

Early career

Christensen was born in Lillerød, Allerød Municipality. The son of former Brøndby goalkeeper Sten Christensen, he began his career with Skjold Birkerød and later joined Brøndby. He spent eight years there, attracting the interest of Europe's elite clubs including Arsenal, Chelsea, Manchester City, and Bayern Munich. On 7 February 2012, Christensen signed for Chelsea on a free transfer, near the end of André Villas-Boas' tenure as the club's manager. Upon joining the London side, Christensen said: "I have chosen Chelsea because they play the kind of football I like.”

Christensen was first included in a Chelsea senior squad for their last game of the 2012–13 season on 19 May 2013, but did not feature in the match, which ended a 2–1 home win over Everton in Rafael Benítez's last match as manager. In the pre-season tour of the United States before the 2013–14 season, he was part of the senior team squad and signed a professional contract thereafter.

2014–15 season
He made his professional debut on 28 October 2014, playing the full 90 minutes at right-back as Chelsea won 2–1 away to Shrewsbury Town in the fourth round of the League Cup. Christensen did not play again until 24 January 2015, when he was utilised in the same position for Chelsea's 4–2 home defeat to League One team Bradford City in the FA Cup fourth round.

Although Christensen played no further part in the campaign, Chelsea won the League Cup with a 2–0 victory over rival club Tottenham Hotspur in the final. When asked who was man of the match for the final, manager José Mourinho said, "Man of the match was Andreas Christensen who played well against Shrewsbury. There are more than John Terry (the official Man of the match for the final) because we are a team. I am proud of the guys."

On 13 April 2015, Christensen played for Chelsea U19 in the final of the 2014–15 UEFA Youth League against Shakhtar Donetsk in Switzerland and although he scored an own goal to cancel out Izzy Brown's opener in the first-half, Chelsea still ended with a 3–2 victory. He made his Premier League debut against Sunderland on 24 May, replacing Mikel John Obi with 12 minutes remaining in a 3–1 home victory. Although Christensen only made one league appearances out of the whole season, Mourinho stated that he would receive a replica medal from his club for his contributions this season.

2015–2017: Loan to Borussia Mönchengladbach
On 10 July 2015, Christensen joined Borussia Mönchengladbach on a two-year loan deal from Chelsea. He made his debut on 10 August against FC St. Pauli in the first round of the DFB-Pokal, winning 4–1. Five days later, Christensen made his Bundesliga debut in a 4–0 loss at Borussia Dortmund. He scored his first professional goals on 5 February 2016, a brace in a 5–1 win over Werder Bremen at Borussia-Park.

After an impressive debut season, Christensen was voted the team's Player of the Season, ahead of Granit Xhaka, the team captain. After the success of his first season, Mönchengladbach made multiple attempts to make his loan permanent during the 2016 summer transfer window, although it was reported that Chelsea rejected the £14.25 million bid from the German club.

In the 2016–17 UEFA Europa League, Christensen scored the final goal of a 4–2 win away to Fiorentina in the second leg of the last 32 to assure a 4–3 aggregate win. He was on target again in the next round against neighbours Schalke, who won on away goals after a 3–3 aggregate draw.

2017–2022: Return to Chelsea

On 12 August 2017, Christensen made his first appearance for Chelsea following his two-year loan spell in Germany, coming off the bench following captain Gary Cahill being sent off, in Chelsea's 3–2 opening day home defeat against Burnley. Eight days later, he made his first Premier League start in a 2–1 victory over Tottenham Hotspur at Wembley Stadium. On 9 January 2018, Christensen signed a new four-and-half-year deal with Chelsea running until 2022, after establishing himself in the first team. Christensen made 40 appearances for the Blues in 2017–18, including three in the victorious FA Cup campaign. However, a back injury meant he was not involved in the final. Prior to the season's finish, he was awarded the club's Young Player of the Year award.

New manager Maurizio Sarri preferred to pair David Luiz and Antonio Rüdiger in central defence, and by February 2019 Christensen had made 15 appearances, only two of which in the league. However, he ruled out wanting to leave the club.

On 29 May 2021, Christensen replaced the injured Thiago Silva in the 39th minute as he won his first-ever UEFA Champions League after Chelsea won 1–0 against Manchester City in the 2021 UEFA Champions League Final in Porto. On 20 October 2021, Christensen scored his first goal for Chelsea in a 4–0 win against Malmö FF in the group stage of the Champions League.

Barcelona 
On 4 July 2022, Christensen signed for La Liga club Barcelona in a free transfer on a four-year contract with a buyout clause of €500 million. On 13 August, he made his debut in 0–0 draw against Rayo Vallecano in the league. He began playing more consistently as the season progressed, and eventually formed a defensive partnership alongside Ronald Araújo, helping Barcelona keep the most clean sheets (16) in all of Europe's top 5 leagues.

International career
On 8 June 2015, Christensen made his senior international debut for Denmark in a 2–1 home friendly win against Montenegro at the Viborg Stadium, as a 69th-minute substitute for Pierre-Emile Højbjerg. On 24 March 2016, Christensen made his first Denmark start in a 2–1 victory over Iceland, playing the full 90 minutes of the friendly at the MCH Arena.

Christensen played six matches in Denmark's successful 2018 FIFA World Cup qualification campaign. On 14 November 2017 he scored his first international goal to equalise in a 5–1 win over the Republic of Ireland in the second leg of the play-off. Manager Åge Hareide called him up for the final tournament in Russia. He partnered Simon Kjær in central defence, having been able to play in that position due to Andreas Bjelland's absence through injury, but played in defensive midfield in the final group game against France. In the last 16 against Croatia, he remained in midfield to combat the opponents' strength in that sector, but made an error that allowed Mario Mandžukić to equalise as Croatia went on to win on penalties.

Andreas Christensen was one of the key players for Denmark during their very successful UEFA Euro 2020 campaign, as he played all six games. On 21 June 2021, Christensen scored a thunderous goal from long range against Russia in a 4–1 win that helped Denmark advance to the knockout-phase of the tournament. After having defeated both Wales and the Czech Republic to get there, Denmark lost to England in the semi-final 2–1 after extra time at Wembley Stadium.

Style of play
Christensen is a centre-back and is known for his calmness in possession and precise passing, as well as his aerial dominance. In 2018, Chelsea manager Antonio Conte said the Dane had displayed "great maturity" adding that he has "a lot of trust in Christensen. This player is a player for the present for Chelsea, and for Chelsea's future for 10 or 14 years. He can also become the captain of this team in the future". In appreciation of his playing talents, fans have also labelled him as the 'Danish Maldini', drawing comparisons with the Italian defender Paolo Maldini.

Career statistics

Club

International

Denmark's score listed first, score column indicates score after each Christensen goal

Honours
Chelsea Youth
FA Youth Cup: 2013–14
UEFA Youth League: 2014–15

Chelsea
FA Cup: 2017–18; runner-up: 2019–20, 2020–21
UEFA Champions League: 2020–21
UEFA Europa League: 2018–19
UEFA Super Cup: 2021
FIFA Club World Cup: 2021
EFL Cup runner-up: 2018–19

Barcelona
Supercopa de España: 2022–23

Individual
Danish Talent of the Year: 2015
Borussia Mönchengladbach Player of the Year: 2015–16
Chelsea Young Player of the Year: 2017–18

References

External links

Profile at the FC Barcelona website
Profile at the Danish Football Association website (in Danish)

1996 births
Living people
People from Allerød Municipality
Sportspeople from the Capital Region of Denmark
Danish men's footballers
Association football defenders
Brøndby IF players
Chelsea F.C. players
Borussia Mönchengladbach players
FC Barcelona players
Premier League players
Bundesliga players
La Liga players
FA Cup Final players
UEFA Europa League winning players
UEFA Champions League winning players
Denmark youth international footballers
Denmark under-21 international footballers
Denmark international footballers
2018 FIFA World Cup players
UEFA Euro 2020 players
2022 FIFA World Cup players
Danish expatriate men's footballers
Expatriate footballers in England
Expatriate footballers in Germany
Expatriate footballers in Spain
Danish expatriate sportspeople in England
Danish expatriate sportspeople in Germany
Danish expatriate sportspeople in Spain